William Frederick Fownes Tighe, PC, JP was Lord Lieutenant of Kilkenny from 1847 to 1878.

He was educated at Trinity College Dublin. He married Lady Louisa Maddelena Lennox, daughter of General Charles Lennox, 4th Duke of Richmond and Lady Charlotte Gordon, on 18 April 1825. They lived at Woodstock. County Kilkenny.

He died on 11 June 1878.

References

1878 deaths
Lord-Lieutenants of Kilkenny
Members of the Privy Council of Ireland